KXPO (1340 AM, "Expo Radio") is a radio station licensed to serve Grafton, North Dakota.  The station is owned by Simmons Broadcasting Inc. It airs news/talk and country music programming.

The station was assigned the KXPO call letters by the Federal Communications Commission.

References

External links

XPO
Grafton, North Dakota